The 1929 German Grand Prix was a Grand Prix motor race held at the Nürburgring on 14 July 1929.

Classification

Race

References
 http://www.teamdan.com/archive/gen/1929.html#deu 

German Grand Prix
German Grand Prix
Grand Prix